Glissade was a roller coaster located at Busch Gardens Williamsburg in Virginia. It was situated in the area where Izzy/Wild Maus was once located. Glissade closed permanently in 1985, and it was replaced by a defunct attraction called The Curse of DarKastle. Then in 2023 it was replaced by DarKoster: Escape the Storm.

Type 
Steel - Sit Down
Make / Model:  Schwarzkopf / All Models / Jet Star 3 / Jumbo Jet
Designer:  Ing.-Büro Stengel GmbH
Lift / Launch System:  Electric Spiral Lift

Relocations 
Busch Gardens Williamsburg as Glissade
La Feria Chapultepec Magico as Tornado
Selva Mágica as Tornado

External links
 Glissade at RCDB

Busch Gardens Williamsburg
Roller coasters operated by SeaWorld Parks & Entertainment
Former roller coasters in Virginia